HMS Pennywort was a  that served with the Royal Navy during the Second World War. She served as an ocean escort in the Battle of the Atlantic.

Service history

References

Sources
 
 
 

Flower-class corvettes of the Royal Navy
1941 ships